Kay Hooper (born 1957) is a New York Times bestselling American author of more than 60 books.

Biography
Kay Hooper was born in Merced County, California to Martha and James Hooper. Her father, an Air Force employee, was stationed in the base hospital. James, Martha (1938-2002), and Kay lived on the base. Shortly after Kay's birth, the family moved back to North Carolina where she was raised and went to school. Her two younger siblings were born in North Carolina.

Kay Hooper lives in Rutherford County, North Carolina, near her father and her siblings. She fosters cats and kittens for the Community Pet Center, a non-profit rescue organization on whose board she also sits.

Her first book, entitled The Lady Thief, was published in 1981 and she has since gone on to publish over 70 books. She made the New York Times Best Sellers List in 2000 with her book Stealing Shadows and was nominated for the Shamus Award for Best Original P.I. Paperback for House of Cards, part of The Bishop Series, in 1992.

Selected works

The Quinn/Thief series

The Men of Mysteries Past series
All for Quinn / August 1993
The Trouble with Jared / June 1993
Hunting the Wolfe / April 1993
The Touch of Max / February 1993

The Once Upon a Time series
The Matchmaker / October 1991
Star-Crossed Lovers / October 1990
The Lady and the Lion / September 1990
Through the Looking Glass / June 1990
What Dreams May Come / April 1990
The Glass Shoe / November 1989
Golden Threads / September 1989

The Bishop/Special Crimes Unit series
 Shadows trilogy
 
 
 
 Evil trilogy
 
 
 
 Fear trilogy
 
 
 
 Blood trilogy
 
 
 
 Haven trilogy
 
  
 
 Dark Trilogy
 
 
 
 The Bishop Files
 
 
 

 Bishop / Special Crimes Unit

The Hagen series
Aces High / April 1989
It Takes a Thief / March 1989
Captain's Paradise / December 1988
Shades of Gray / October 1988
Outlaw Derek / April 1988
Unmasking Kelsey / February 1988
The Fall of Lucas Kendrick / January 1988
Zach's Law / December 1987
Rafferty's Wife / November 1987
Raven on the Wing / May 1987
In Serena's Web / April 1987

Compilations
The Real Thing / November 2004(Reissue of 2 novels: Enemy Mine and The Haviland Touch)
Elusive / March 2004(Reissue of 3 novels: Elusive Dawn, On Her Doorstep, and Return Engagement)
Enchanted / January 2003(Reissue of 3 novels: Kissed by Magic, Belonging to Taylor, and Eye of the Beholder)

Stand-alone novels
Haunting Rachel / July 1999
Finding Laura / July 1998
After Caroline / October 1997
Amanda / September 1996
The Haunting of Josie / August 1994
Masquerade / February 1994
The Wizard of Seattle / June 1993
House of Cards / November 1991
The Haviland Touch / June 1991 (Reissued December 2005)
Crime of Passion / February 1991
Enemy Mine / August 1989 (Reissued November 2005)
Delaney Historicals II: Velvet Lightning / November 1988
Delaney Historicals: Golden Flames / April 1988
Summer of the Unicorn / March 1988
The Delaney's of Killaroo: Adelaide, the Enchantress / September 1987
On Her Doorstep / December 1986
The Shamrock Trinity: Rafe, the Maverick / October 1986
Time After Time / July 1986
Larger Than Life (1986; available only through Loveswept book club until 2009 reissue)
Belonging to Taylor / March 1986
Rebel Waltz / February 1986
Eye of the Beholder / May 1985
Illegal Possession / March 1985
If There Be Dragons / December 1984
Pepper's Way / September 1984
Something Different / May 1984
Moonlight Rhapsody / May 1984
CJ's Fate / February 1984
Kissed by Magic / November 1983
Elusive Dawn / July 1983
On Wings of Magic / June 1983
Taken by Storm / March 1983
Breathless Surrender / November 1982
Return Engagement / September 1982
Mask of Passion / August 1982
Lady Thief / July 1981 (Reissued March 2005)

Stories published in anthologies

References

External links

 
 
 

20th-century American novelists
American mystery writers
People from Rutherford County, North Carolina
1957 births
Living people
Date of birth missing (living people)
21st-century American novelists
American women novelists
20th-century American women writers
21st-century American women writers
Women mystery writers
Writers from North Carolina